Cimbric may refer to:

The Cimbri, an ancient Germanic people
The Cimbrian language, a modern Germanic language spoken in northern Italy